Richard Bauer (March 14, 1939 – March 1, 1999) was an American actor.  He won an Obie Award in 1978 for his performances in Landscape of the Body and The Dybbuk.

Filmography

Awards

References

External links
 
 
 

1939 births
1999 deaths
20th-century American male actors
American male stage actors
Obie Award recipients
Male actors from St. Louis
Male actors from Washington, D.C.